Peter Murrieta is an American television producer and writer.

He is best known for his work on the Disney Channel sitcom Wizards of Waverly Place, in which he served as head writer and executive producer during the first three seasons. He went on to win two Emmy Awards  for his work on the series and Wizards of Waverly Place: The Movie. His most recent work is being an executive producer for the Cartoon Network live-action series, Level Up.

He has two sons named Joaquin Aaron Murrieta and Daniel Storms Murrieta and is residing in the Los Angeles County.

Murrieta's other television credits include All About the Andersons, Hope & Faith, Jesse and Greetings from Tucson, which he created.

More recently, he signed a first look deal with Universal Television.

References

External links

American television producers
American television writers
American male television writers
Emmy Award winners
Living people
Place of birth missing (living people)
Year of birth missing (living people)